La Granja (Spanish for "the farm") is a commune of Chile located in Santiago Province, Santiago Metropolitan Region.

Demographics
The population fell by 0.6% (765 persons) between the 1992 and 2002 censuses. The 2006 projected population was 129,707.

Stats
Average annual household income: US$24,662 (PPP, 2006)
Population below poverty line: 14.2% (2006)
Regional quality of life index: 77.93, mid-high, 18 out of 52 (2005)
Human Development Index: 0.689, 158 out of 341 (2003)

Administration
As a commune, La Granja is a third-level administrative division of Chile administered by a municipal council, headed by an alcalde who is directly elected every four years. The 2012-2016 alcalde is Felipe Delpin Aguilar (DC). The communal council has the following members:
 Cristián Carmona Macaya (DC)
 Rodrigo Quezada Arriagada (IND)
 Juan Valdés Valdés (PS)
 Germán Pino Maturana (PPD)
 Sergio Robles Pinto (PC)
 Silvana Poblete Romero (PS)
 Berta Venegas Maldonado (DC)
 Patricio Oyarce Bravo (UDI)

Within the electoral divisions of Chile, La Granja is represented in the Chamber of Deputies by Felipe Salaberry (UDI) and Ximena Vidal (PPD) as part of the 25th electoral district, (together with Macul and San Joaquín). The commune is represented in the Senate by Soledad Alvear (PDC) and Pablo Longueira (UDI) as part of the 8th senatorial constituency (Santiago-East).

References

Populated places in Santiago Province, Chile
Communes of Chile